The flag of Primorsky Krai is a rectangular panel, divided diagonally by a white stripe and consisting of two triangles: the top one, placed at the flagpole, red and the bottom blue. In the upper corner near the shaft there is a golden image of a Ussuri tiger walking. The ratio of the width of the flag to its length is 2:3. The width of the white stripe on the shaft shall be one fifth of the entire width of the flag; the height of the tiger figure should be one fourth of the width of the flag on the pole. It is a representative, identification and legal mark, drawn up and used in accordance with the rules of vexillology. The idea of the flag was proposed by V. A. Obertas, a professor at the Institute of Architecture, FESTU.

The colours of the flag symbolize:
Red – the colour of deeds, sacrifice, victory, celebration, a symbol of courage, courage and fearlessness. These qualities residents and warriors of the Primorsky Krai have repeatedly shown in the most different periods of the existence of Primorye.
Blue – the colour of honesty, loyalty to duty, a symbol of beauty, gentleness, grandeur. These qualities are also inherent in the Primorye and the unique nature of the region. In addition, the blue color also symbolizes the sea, with which the life and fate of the majority of the inhabitants of the region are connected today and forever. 
White – the colour in the form of a stripe, directed diagonally upwards, marks the movement forward to new challenges, to new heights.
All colours of the Primorsky Krai flag together symbolize the unity of the region and Russia, since the same colors are included in the national flag of the Russian Federation (without repeating it).
The figure of the Ussurian tiger – the main figure of the coat of arms of the Primorsky Krai uniquely identifies the flag belonging to the Primorsky Krai.

References
Flags of the World
Закон Приморского края «О флаге Приморского края» от 21.01.2003 № 32—КЗ

Flag of Primorsky Krai
Flags of the federal subjects of Russia
Flags introduced in 1995
Primorsky